Eric Lamont Downing (born September 16, 1978), is a former American football defensive tackle in the National Football League. He was drafted in the third round of the 2001 NFL Draft.

High school career
Downing attended John F. Kennedy High School, in Paterson, New Jersey, where he was selected for the first-team All-State.

References

External links
 Current Stats

1978 births
Living people
John F. Kennedy High School (Paterson, New Jersey) alumni
Players of American football from Paterson, New Jersey
Players of American football from North Carolina
American football defensive tackles
Coffeyville Red Ravens football players
Syracuse Orange football players
Kansas City Chiefs players
San Diego Chargers players